Paul Cuttoli (28 June 1864 - 27 April 1949) was a French politician.

Cuttoli was born in Bologhine, Algeria (then known as Saint-Eugène).  He was a Member of the Chamber of Deputies from 1906 to 1919, a Senator from 1920 to 1940 and a Member of the Constituent Assembly elected in 1945. He belonged to the Radical Party.

References

Formulaire de recherche dans la base de données des députés français depuis 1789 - Assemblée nationale

1864 births
1949 deaths
People from Bologhine
People of French Algeria
Pieds-Noirs
Radical Party (France) politicians
Members of the 9th Chamber of Deputies of the French Third Republic
Members of the 10th Chamber of Deputies of the French Third Republic
Members of the 11th Chamber of Deputies of the French Third Republic
French Senators of the Third Republic
Senators of French Algeria
Members of the Constituent Assembly of France (1945)